Cedeno Patrick (born July 30, 1983) is an Arena Football League Veteran  defensive back who is currently a free agent. Patrick played college football at Delaware State University. He has also played for the Baltimore Mariners, New Jersey Revolution, Tulsa Talons, Huntington Hammer, Harrisburg Stampede, Las Vegas Outlaws and the High Country Grizzlies Saskatchewan Rough Riders.

College career
He was part of the Track and Field and Football teams at Delaware State University.

Professional career
He started his career in the AIFA (American Indoor Football Association) with the (New Jersey Revolution). Where Cedeno was noticed for his tremendous 4.35 forty yard dash speed. He was moved up during the season to AFL (Arena Football League) to the Tulsa Talons. Later returned to New Jersey Revolution to finish out his season. In 2009 Cedeno was signed by the Baltimore Mariners. in 2011 Patrick signed with the Harrisburg Stampede until 2014. And currently plays in the AFL with the (Las Vegas Outlaws). In 2017 Signed  in the NAL National Arena League with the High Country Grizzlies.

References
 http://sportsillustrated.cnn.com/football/ncaa/players/23561
 http://www.beyondsportsnetwork.com/CedenoPatrick83
 https://web.archive.org/web/20110714185320/http://www.njrevs.com/roster
 http://www.europlayers.com/Profile/010111935
 
 http://www.greatnj.com/njrevs/team_roster.html

Living people
American football defensive backs
Players of American football from New York (state)
1983 births
Baltimore Mariners players
Tulsa Talons players
Huntington Hammer players
Harrisburg Stampede players
Las Vegas Outlaws (arena football) players
High Country Grizzlies players
Delaware State Hornets football players
Sportspeople from Mount Vernon, New York